The Aladdin Theater (also known as The Historic Cocoa Village Playhouse) is an historic theater in Cocoa, Florida, United States. It is located at 300 Brevard Avenue and originally opened its doors on August 18, 1924. On October 17, 1991, it was added to the U.S. National Register of Historic Places.

Brevard Community College owned the theater from 1985 to 2010. In the mid-eighties, the college had rescued the theater from a dilapidated state. In 2010 the college offered ownership to the city of Cocoa. The theater has its own board of directors.

The annual budget for 2009 was about $263,000.

History
In 1924 the Aladdin Theater first started showing silent movies and live acts.  It was built for $80,000.  The Sparks Theater chain purchased the Aladdin in 1939 and changed its name to the "State Theater."

The Kent Theater Chain purchased the building in 1960 and renamed it the Fine Arts Theater.

Subsequently, the city of Cocoa bought the building and renamed it the Cocoa Village Playhouse. The city sold it to Brevard Community College for $1 in 1984. Through donations, and grants, the building was restored from 1985 through 1989. In 1990, the playhouse began staging community based musicals.

The theater was heavily featured in the 1993 film Matinee, where it portrayed the fictional Key West Strand Theater. The film, set during the Cuban Missile Crisis, starred John Goodman.

In 2007, a $2.8 million annex was started.

In 2011, the building was returned to the city of Cocoa.

In 2012, there were 50,000 paying customers annually.

References

External links

Cocoa Village Playhouse (official site)
Cocoa Village Playhouse (additional info via Cocoa Village Publishing)
Brevard County listings at National Register of Historic Places
Florida's Office of Cultural and Historical Programs
Brevard County listings
Cocoa Village Playhouse
Cocoa-Rockledge Historical Trail (Archived 2009-10-24) at Historic Hiking Trails (Archived 2009-10-24)

Buildings and structures in Brevard County, Florida
National Register of Historic Places in Brevard County, Florida
Theatres on the National Register of Historic Places in Florida
Tourist attractions in Brevard County, Florida
Theatres completed in 1924
Cocoa, Florida
1924 establishments in Florida